Sanbaimen Power Station or  Xuzhou Power Station is a large coal-fired power station in China.

See also 

 List of coal power stations
 List of power stations in China

External links 

 Sanbaimen Power Station on Global Energy Monitor

References 

Coal-fired power stations in China